The women's rugby sevens tournament in the World Rugby Sevens Challenger Series for 2020 was cancelled due to the COVID-19 pandemic. The tournament had been scheduled for 28–29 March 2020 in Stellenbosch, South Africa at the Danie Craven Stadium with twelve teams competing.

It was intended to be the qualifying event for the World Rugby Sevens Series, with the winner gaining promotion as a core team for the 2020–21 season. World Rugby initially postponed the tournament without rescheduling a future date, before eventually cancelling it altogether. As such, there was no team promoted or relegated for the 2020–21 World Rugby Women's Sevens Series.

Teams
There were 12 national women's teams qualified for the Challenger Series tournament for 2020.

Tour venue

See also

 2020 World Rugby Sevens Challenger Series – Men's tour

References

External links
Official site

Sevens
Rugby sevens competitions
World Rugby Sevens Challenger Series
World Rugby Sevens Challenger Series Women's